
Year 735 (DCCXXXV) was a common year starting on Saturday (link will display the full calendar) of the Julian calendar. The denomination 735 for this year has been used since the early medieval period, when the Anno Domini calendar era became the prevalent method in Europe for naming years.

Events 
 By place 
 Europe 
 Charles Martel, Merovingian mayor of the palace, invades Burgundy. Duke Hunald I of Aquitaine refuses to recognise the authority of the Franks, whereupon Charles marches south of the River Loire, seizing the cities of Bordeaux and Blaye. Within 4 years he will have subdued all the Burgundian chieftains, while continuing to fight off Moorish advances into Gaul.
 King Liutprand of the Lombards raises his nephew Hildeprand to co-kingship, after a serious illness (approximate date).
 Siege of al-Sakhra: Moors under Uqba ibn al-Hajjaj (governor of Al-Andalus) besiege Pelagius, king of Asturias, in the uppermost Northern mountain ranges in Iberia. The battle ends inconclusively, with Pelagius surviving, but 270 out of his 300 followers are killed, at least according to a Muslim chronicle from the 11th century.

 Asia 
 During the Tang Dynasty in China, by this year there is 149,685,400 kg (165,000 short tons) of grain shipped annually along the Grand Canal.
 A major smallpox epidemic starts in Japan, which reduces the population by 30%.

 Armenia 
735 Vayots Dzor Province earthquake. It affected the Vayots Dzor Province.The earthquake reportedly destroyed an entire valley. The reported casualties included at least 10,000 victims.

 By topic 
 Literature 
 The Khöshöö Tsaidam Monuments of Bilge Khan, ruler (khagan) of the Turkic Khaganate, and his brother Kul Tigin, are erected. (Bilge has already erected Kül Tigin's monument and Bilge's son erects Bilge's monument.)

 Religion 
 May 26 – Bede, Anglo-Saxon monk-historian, dies at Monkwearmouth–Jarrow Abbey. He will be remembered as "the Venerable", and is the author of books that are copied and studied later all over Europe. His greatest book is the Historia ecclesiastica gentis Anglorum, a major source for the history of Britain, in the immediate post-Roman period.
 The see of York receives the pallium from pope Gregory III, and is elevated to an archbishopric. Ecgbert becomes the first archbishop.

Births 
 Abu Yusuf, Muslim jurist and chief adviser (or 738)
 Alcuin, Anglo-Saxon missionary (approximate date)
 Dantidurga, founder of the Rashtrakuta Empire (d. 756)
 Du You, chancellor of the Tang Dynasty (d. 812)
 Kardam, ruler (khan) of the Bulgarian Empire
 Plato of Sakkoudion, Byzantine abbot (approximate date)

Deaths 
 May 26 – Bede, Anglo-Saxon theologian and historian
 December 6 – Toneri, Japanese prince (b. 676)
 Abi Ishaq, Arab grammarian (approximate date)
 Adela, Frankish abbess (approximate date)
 Cathal mac Muiredaig, king of Connacht (Ireland)
 Cellach mac Fáelchair, king of Osraige (Ireland)
 Eudes, duke of Aquitaine (approximate date)

References

Sources